The Ochtum is a river in Lower Saxony and Bremen, Germany.

Course 
The Ochtum forms its tailwater and heads in a northwesterly direction into the state of Bremen where it forms part of its border with Lower Saxony. A second branch of the Ochtum – its original channel – flows north past  and joins the main river in the nature reserve. The Ochtum passes Delmenhorst-Hasbergen and Lemwerder-Deichshausen and discharges into the Weser at river kilometre 12.85 between Lemwerder- and Bremen-Seehausen near Unterweser.

History 
 1158 – The Ochtum is first mentioned as the Ochtmund (= Ochtum mouth). Later also recorded as Ochen, Ochtmoni or Oggen.
 1234 – Battle of Altenesch
 1400 – First regulations concerning the Ochtum
 1571 – Breach of the Ochtum dyke
 1833 – Im Warfelde the Ochtum is diverted along a side channel, which gets rid of a large number of bends. Water flow improves.
 1881 – During a time of very high water the Middle Weser bursts the dyke near Hoya, so that a large amount of floodwater is led away by the Ochtum. 
 1962 – the depression around the Ochtum is completely flooded by the North Sea on 16/17 February and Bremen is separated from the district of Bremen-Huchting. In Huchting several people die in the allotments occupied by folk whose homes had been bombed during the war.
 28 January 1966 – An aeroplane belonging to the German airline Lufthansa crashes near the Ochtum after an aborted landing at Bremen Airport. All 46 passengers and crew are killed. See Lufthansa Flight 005.
 1973 – In November and December 1973 several storm surges cause serious damage in the area between the mouth and Huchting. One person dies. 
 1976 – In January two very severe storm surges cause heavy damage between Huchting and the mouth of the Ochtum. During the storm surge of 3 January 1976 water levels are reached similar to those experienced in the floods of February 1962.
 2 June 1976 – Completion of the Ochtum Barrage near Altenesch, for which the Lower Saxon State Department for Waterways, Coastal and Nature Conservation (Niedersächsische Landesbetrieb für Wasserwirtschaft, Küsten- and Naturschutz or NLWKN) is responsible. The old port on the Ochtum is moved to its present location below the Ochtum barrage.

Water quality 
According to the 2000 water quality map by the state of Bremen the Ochtum is classified as Class II, moderately polluted, as far as the district of Bremen-Strom.

Economy

Importances as a transport route 
The Ochtum is used by water sports clubs. The paths on the Ochtum dykes are popular with cyclists and inline skaters.

See also
List of rivers of Bremen
List of rivers of Lower Saxony

References

External links 
 Ochtum Association 
 Ochtum 
 NLWK office at Sulingen: Ochtum 

Rivers of Bremen (state)
Rivers of Lower Saxony
Rivers of Germany